Wives and Other Wives is a 1918 American silent comedy-drama film directed by Lloyd Ingraham and starring  Mary Miles Minter, based on a story by Jules Furthman. As with many of Minter's features, it is thought to be a lost film.

Plot

As described in various film magazine reviews, newly-married Robin Challoner (Minter) is upset by her husband Geoffrey (Chase) reading the newspaper at the breakfast table. Shutting herself in their bedroom, she begins to burn love letters from earlier in their relationship when her husband enters and offers to help her. Not realising that the letters are his, he is stricken with jealousy when Robin refuses to burn one particular package, and storms out of their apartment.

Meanwhile another couple, Mr. and Mrs. Craig, have been viewing the upstairs apartment. When Mrs. Craig (Shelby) leaves her wrap behind, she sends her husband Norman (Garwood) to retrieve it. He gets off the elevator on the wrong floor and enters the Challoner apartment by mistake, where Robin, mistaking him for a burglar, shoots at him. Mr. Craig faints from fright and Robin, thinking she has killed him, flees the apartment to seek a doctor. While she is gone, Geoffrey Challoner returns to find another man on the floor of his wife's bedroom. He refuses to listen to Robin's explanations, and decides to seek a divorce. Mrs. Craig, having also entered the apartment seeking her husband, declares that she too wants a divorce.

Judge Corcoran (Periolat), a friend of both couples, decides to intervene to help repair their relationships. He invites the Challoners to his country home for a visit, along with Mrs. Craig and another couple, the Doubledays. Mr. Craig decides to join them, but turns up somewhat the worse for wear, and falls asleep in Robin's room by mistake, where she screams upon the discovery that the man in her bed is not her husband. Meanwhile, Mr. Challoner has ended up in Mrs. Craig's room in error, and neither couple is any closer to reconciliation.

In the meantime, the Doubledays are plotting a fake jewellery robbery to cash in on an insurance policy. When some of the Judge's staff overhear them, they decide to steal the jewellery instead. While searching for clues to this robbery, the Judge finds the unburnt letters that Robin brought with her. Believing them to be a clue to the robbery, he places them in a drawer and announces to all present that he expects to see them exchanged for the jewellery before morning.

Eager to retrieve her letters, Robin plans to sneak into the Judge's study that night, as does her husband, who is still keen to know who wrote them. On her way to the study, Robin comes across the household staff, who are trying to escape with the jewellery. When the Judge is alerted, they admit to the robbery, but also reveal the Doubledays' planned fraud. Once the Doubledays have been expelled from the house, it is revealed that Geoffrey Challoner was the author of the letters all along, and both couples are happily reconciled.

Cast
Mary Miles Minter as Robin Challoner
Colin Chase as Geoffrey Challoner
George Periolat as Judge Corcoran
William Garwood as Norman Craig
Margaret Shelby as Mrs. Craig
Virginia Ware as Mrs. Corcoran
Carl Stockdale as Ted Doubleday
Eugenie Forde as Mrs. Doubleday
Marie Morledge as Rita
John Gough as Higgins

References

External links

lantern slide(Wayback Machine)

1918 films
1918 comedy-drama films
1910s English-language films
American silent feature films
American black-and-white films
Films directed by Lloyd Ingraham
Films with screenplays by Jules Furthman
Lost American films
Pathé Exchange films
1918 lost films
Lost comedy-drama films
1910s American films
Silent American comedy-drama films